This is the training school    for non-commissioned officers (NCO) of the French Air Force, recruited directly from the civilian life or the EETAA 722 school. This aeronautic establishment prepares tomorrow's task forces to quickly be dispatched in foreign military operations.

The school campus located south of Rochefort 
hosts on average 6,300 NCOs. It provides an initial military formation followed by an advanced technical training chosen among thirty streams in aeronautics such as: engine, structure, armament, embedded systems, logistics...etc... These courses last from 20 to 48 weeks and are open to all military corps using aerial equipment:  French Army, French Navy and Gendarmerie.
It’s the largest military site of the Nouvelle-Aquitaine region.

References and external links

Sous -officiers de l'armée de l'air
 Chant de l'EFSOAA 
 Ecole de formation des sous-officiers de l'Armée de l'Air (EFSOAA)

Military training establishments of France
Military units and formations established in 1979
Training establishments of the French Air and Space Force